Rehlingen-Siersburg is a municipality in the district of Saarlouis, in Saarland, Germany. It is situated on the river Saar, approx. 8 km northwest of Saarlouis, and 30 km northwest of Saarbrücken.

Geography

Location 
Rehlingen is located at the Saar, Siersburg is located at the Nied, the other districts are partly on the Gau (Saargau), partly in the valley of the Nied, a left-side tributary of the Saar. Rehlingen-Siersburg borders France to the west, Merzig-Wadern district to the north, Dillingen / Saar to the east, and Wallerfangen to the south.

Municipal districts 

 Biringen
 Eimersdorf
 Fremersdorf
 Fürweiler
 Gerlfangen
 Hemmersdorf
 Niedaltdorf
 Oberesch
 Rehlingen Siersburg

Sights 

 Castle Fremersdorf
 Castle Siersburg
 Niedaltdorf stalactite cave
 Lorraine houses and castles in different districts
 Niedtal
 Saargau
 Druids path

References

Saarlouis (district)